Otoceratoidea, formerly Otocerataceae, is an extinct superfamily of ammonite cephalopods in the order Ceratitida.

References

 The Paleobiology Database Accessed on 9/24/07

Otoceratina
Ceratitida superfamilies